Located in the heart of Pinetop-Lakeside, Woodland Lake and the park surrounding it have been called the town's "Crown Jewel." In addition to trout fishing, the lake provides a host of other outdoor recreation opportunities. Woodland Lake lies on Apache-Sitgreaves National Forests property, just west of White Mountain Blvd. in Pinetop.

Description

Because the lake is part of the local irrigation district, at drawdown, it averages . It is shallow and nutrient rich, making it subject to water quality problems in the summer. For this reason, the lake is stocked primarily with catchable-sized rainbow trout in the spring and early summer. The lake also contains a few largemouth bass and channel catfish.

Amenities

The town of Pinetop-Lakeside maintains Woodland Park, which includes hiking trails, picnic tables and ramadas, barrier-free restrooms, a sand volleyball court, tennis court, two children's playgrounds, some ball fields, a boat ramp and a barrier-free, floating fishing dock.

Fish species
 Rainbow trout(stocked in Spring and early Summer)
 Largemouth Bass
 Bluegill
 Green Sunfish
 Channel catfish
 Fathead Minnows
 Crayfish
 American Bullfrogs

External links
 Arizona Boating Locations Facilities Map
 Arizona Fishing Locations Map
 Little Colorado River Watershed
 

Reservoirs in Navajo County, Arizona
Apache-Sitgreaves National Forests
Reservoirs in Arizona